Lloyd Henry Scurfield Roberts (8 June 1907 – 11 March 1961) was an Australian politician.

Politics 
Roberts was the Country Party member for Whitsunday in the Legislative Assembly of Queensland from 1950 until his death in 1961.

Later life 
Roberts died on 11 April 1961 in Brisbane.

References

1907 births
1961 deaths
National Party of Australia members of the Parliament of Queensland
Members of the Queensland Legislative Assembly
Place of birth missing
20th-century Australian politicians